Roger Lou Belvedere Cook (born 6 April 1943) is a New Zealand-born British investigative journalist and television broadcaster. In 1997, he won a British Academy of Film & Television Arts (BAFTA) special award "for 25 years of outstanding quality investigative reporting", for his show The Cook Report.

Early life
Cook's parents were New Zealanders, but he was brought up in Australia, and began his career with the Australian Broadcasting Corporation as a reporter and newsreader on both radio and television.

In 1968, Cook moved to the United Kingdom where he joined BBC Radio 4's The World At One programme and subsequently worked on several other BBC radio and television programmes, including PM, Nationwide, and Newsnight.

Checkpoint
In 1973, Cook created and presented the Radio 4 programme Checkpoint, which specialised in investigating and exposing criminals, con-men, injustice and official incompetence, often confronting the subjects of the investigation on tape. In 1979 Cook was threatened by  Don Arden when he started to look into the business practices of the notorious rock manager. 

In 1981, during a Checkpoint report for Newsnight, Cook was filmed being violently assaulted with a metal bar by a Brighton antique dealer after he confronted the man about selling fake antiques; Cook suffered three cracked ribs in the assault.

The Cook Report
In 1985, Cook moved from the BBC to Central, and in 1987 launched a new TV series, The Cook Report. This was a higher-budget version of his radio programme, with a large and dedicated research team, which enabled it to operate on an international scale. The show became known for its filmed 'stings' and for Cook's frequent confrontations with his targets, during which he (and sometimes the film crew) often suffered verbal and physical abuse. Cook was described in the British press as "nemesis in a leisure shirt", "a cross between Meatloaf and the Equaliser", "the bravest/most beaten-up journalist in Britain" and "The Taped Crusader".

The Cook Report ran for 16 series until 1999, when it was cancelled by ITV Network Centre. In its 12 years on air, The Cook Report was the highest rated current affairs programme on British television, with audiences peaking at over 12 million. In 2007, the programme returned for a 90-minute special entitled Roger Cook's Greatest Hits, in which Cook revisited and updated a number of his stories. Cook said in 2007 that he had received death threats as a result of the series.

The programme and its production team won 11 national and international awards, culminating in a British Academy of Film & Television Arts (BAFTA) special award for Cook in 1997 "for 25 years of outstanding quality investigative reporting".

Other activities
Cook has published several books, including an autobiography, Dangerous Ground. In October 2011 he released a revised and updated autobiography, More Dangerous Ground.

Cook also holds an Emeritus Visiting Professorship at the Centre for Broadcasting and Journalism at Nottingham Trent University and was made an Honorary Doctor of Letters by the University in 2004.

Parodies
Cook has been parodied by comedians including Benny Hill and Reeves and Mortimer. In the 1980s, his Checkpoint series was the inspiration for a sitcom, BBC Radio 4's Delve Special, where investigative journalist David Lander, played by Stephen Fry, doorstepped many fictional villains. When Cook's investigations moved to television, the parody followed, in Channel 4's This is David Lander, with Tony Slattery later taking over the central role in the show. Many of Lander and Harper's investigations were based on reports made by Cook, Panorama and World in Action.

A puppet version of Cook also appeared several times in the satirical series Spitting Image. In one sketch, Cook's puppet double goes to the Pearly Gates and confronts God as if he were a crooked estate agent who promised land to the Jews, only to offer the same land to the Arabs under the name of Allah.

Viz comic also did a parody with "Roger Mellie, The Man on the Telly" appearing in a comic version of the show entitled The Crook Report.

In I'm Alan Partridge, the protagonist proposed a slapstick version of The Cook Report called "Alan Attack!"

Personal life
Cook has been married twice, first for five years whilst he was living in Australia. He married his second wife, Frances, in 1983; they had one daughter, born in 1985.

References

1943 births
Living people
Academics of Nottingham Trent University
New Zealand emigrants to the United Kingdom
New Zealand journalists
Undercover journalists
New Zealand emigrants to Australia
Australian emigrants to England
Australian journalists
New Zealand radio journalists
Australian radio journalists
New Zealand television journalists
Australian television journalists
BAFTA winners (people)